Hydro Fehérvár AV19 is a Hungarian ice hockey team that plays in the Austrian bet-at-home ICE Hockey League. They were founded in 1960 and played from 1978 in the Hungarian Országos Bajnokság I through sorts of affiliations until 2012, claiming the Championship on 13 occasions. They play their home games at Ifjabb Ocskay Gábor Ice Hall in Székesfehérvár.  In 2009, the club was renamed after the main sponsor Sapa Profiles Kft Hungary, the Hungarian subsidiary of a Swedish aluminum group. The club did not have a main naming sponsor for a couple of years before 2019, however, in 2019 Hydro Extrusion Hungary Kft, the Hungarian subsidiary of the Norwegian company became the new naming sponsor, thus naming the club Hydro Fehérvár AV19.

History
Székesfehérvári Volán Sports Club was founded in 1960. In 1964–65, the team started playing in outdoor rinks and 10 years later the hockey department came together with the intention of having a professional team. In 1977, the opening of a rink started a new chapter in the history of Hungarian hockey and Volan. At this point, only Budapest and Dunaújváros had suitable structure for hockey. They played their first season in the Hungarian championships in 1977–78, and three years later on the back of Budapest VSC folding and the Sports club benefiting from an influx of BVSC players captured their first Hungarian championship in 1981, becoming the first provincial team to do so.

At the turn of the millennium, Alba Volán-FeVita rose to prominence to become the top team in the nation. This culminated in the series of 10 consecutive championship titles of the Hungarian league from 2003. This turn of domination persuaded the club seek application into the Austrian League for stronger competition. This happened against the background, to better expose the players of the national team in the A-group level. In their first EBEL season in 2007–08, Alba Volánbusz experienced to skill level difference and finished in last place, this was offset however, by the successful Hungarian national team inclusion at the 2008 IIHF World Championships after seventy years back promotion to the highest international division.

Fehérvár AV19' still competed in the Hungarian Championship at first, with the club sourcing a farm team SAPA AV19 Székesfehérvár II in the Championship or the MOL Liga. However, after many years of struggling to field a competitive team in 2012 they were unable to participate in the Hungarian Championship, as they were required to enter their second team in the Erste Bank Junior League. They did not directly inform the Hungarian Ice Hockey Federation of their decision. This led to angst, however, the club still participated in the Hungarian Cup.

Achievements
Hungarian Championship:
Winners (13) : 1981, 1999, 2001, 2003, 2004, 2005, 2006, 2007, 2008, 2009, 2010, 2011, 2012
Interliga:
Winners (2): 2003, 2007
IIHF Continental Cup:
Third place (1) : 2005

Players and personnel

Current roster
Updated 4 February 2023.

|}

Head coaches

  József Kertész 1977–1979
  Ambrus Kósa 1979–1981
  János Balogh 1981–1983
  Antal Palla 1983–1985
  Gábor Ocskay senior 1985–1988
  Ferenc Lőrincz 1988–1989
  Elek Tamás 1989–1991
  Borisz Puskarjov 1996–97
  Tibor Kiss 1997–2000
  Jan Jasko 2000–2003
  Branislav Sajban 2003–2004
  Pat Cortina 2004–2006
  Karol Dvorak 2006
  Jan Jasko 2006–2008
  Lajos Énekes 2008
  Ted Sator 2008–2009
  Lajos Énekes 2009
  Jarmo Tolvanen 2009–2010
  Ulf Weinstock 2010–2011
  Kevin Primeau 2011–2012
  Jan Neliba 2012–2013
  Marty Raymond 2013–2014
  Rob Pallin 2014–2016
  Tyler Dietrich 2016
  Benoit Laporte 2016–2017
  Hannu Järvenpää 2017–2020
 Antti Karhula 2020–2021
 Kevin Constantine 2021–

Honored members

References

External links
 Official Club Website
Club profile on the official site of Erste Bank Eishockey Liga

Ice hockey teams in Hungary
Alba Volán
1960 establishments in Hungary
Austrian Hockey League teams
Interliga (1999–2007) teams
Carpathian League teams